Erline Nolte (born 19 May 1989) is a German former bobsledder. She competed in the two-woman event at the 2018 Winter Olympics. Her personal coach is Heiner Preute.

References

External links
 
 Erline Nolte at the German Bobsleigh, Luge, and Skeleton Federation 

1989 births
Living people
German female bobsledders
Olympic bobsledders of Germany
Bobsledders at the 2018 Winter Olympics
Sportspeople from Dortmund
21st-century German women